Jana Novotná was the defending champion and won in the final 7–5, 6–1 against Monica Seles.

Seeds
A champion seed is indicated in bold text while text in italics indicates the round in which that seed was eliminated. The top two seeds received a bye to the second round.

  Monica Seles (final)
  Jana Novotná (champion)
  Arantxa Sánchez Vicario (semifinals)
  Irina Spîrlea (quarterfinals)
  Mary Joe Fernández (first round)
  Kimberly Po (first round)
  Lisa Raymond (first round)
  Amy Frazier (second round)

Draw

Final

Section 1

Section 2

External links
 1997 Páginas Amarillas Open Draw

Singles